Bircza  is a village in Przemyśl County, Subcarpathian Voivodeship, in south-eastern Poland. It is the seat of the gmina (administrative district) called Gmina Bircza. The village has a population of 1,000.

Jewish community of Bircza
The earliest records of Jewish settlement in the area are from the Sixteenth Century. In the Nineteenth Century, the Jewish community grew to become about half the total size of area’s residents. Initially, the community was part of the Dobromyl community, but by the second half of the Nineteenth Century, it became independent. Most of the Jews in Bircza belonged to Dynów Hassidism, but a minority followed the Sadigura rabbis.

During the conquest of the area by the Russian Empire in the First World War, Cossacks carried out attacks on the Jewish residents, including acts of robbery, rape, and murder. Many local Jews fled to escape the violence and, in the years between the wars, large numbers of the community’s Jews emigrated, many to the United States. In the 1920s and 1930s, Zionist activity in Bircza increased, particularly in the form of youth groups affiliated with Beitar and ha-Noʿar ha-Tsiyyoni, ha-Shomer ha-Tsaʿir, and Aḥvah. During these years, the Jewish community numbered around 1,040 residents out of a total population of 1,930.

Following the outbreak of the Second World War, Bircza and its environs were part of Polish territory under Soviet control, but in June 1941, the Nazi Germans invaded and placed local control in the hands of the Ukrainian Auxiliary Police (Ukrainische Hilfspolizei), which quickly killed sixteen Jewish community notables.

Soon, various restrictions were placed upon the Jews of Bircza and its surrounding villages, including the requirement of wearing a yellow star of David and participating in forced labour, and much Jewish property was looted. Additionally, a Judenrat was established and commanded to transfer ransom payments, valuables, and furs to the Germans.

In July 1942, the German and Ukrainian police carried out a violent operation in which the Jews of the surrounding villages were brought to the market square and forced to bend on their knees for hours. A ghetto was established in the town, as all of Bircza’s neighbouring villages were emptied of their Jewish population. Most of the Jews of Bircza were murdered in two operations, one on Kamienna Górka (‘Stony Hill’) and a further 800 Jews in 1942 on Górze Wierzysko (Wierzysko Hill). Afterwards, the remaining Jews were marched thirty kilometres on foot to the ghetto of Przemyśl, from where they were transferred later to the Belzec extermination camp. One Polish family (Michał and Katarzyna Gierula) from the nearby village of Łodzinka Górna sheltered seven Jews in their barn, but after local residents discovered this, the German authorities killed the adults and their neighbour and the three remaining Jews on 01 January 1944. Their sacrifice was later recognised by Yad Vashem.

A cross was set up on Kamienna Górka and, in 2018, following an effort by Bircza high school students, a sign was placed at the location of the second (and larger) killing site on Górze Wierzysko. Following the Second World War, a Union of Bircza Survivors was active for some decades in Israel. By 2021, only one Holocaust survivor from Bircza and the last remaining Jew born in Bircza (residing now in Herzliyyah, Israel) remained alive in the world.

Notable residents of Bircza
Bircza was also the birthplace of Yov Boretsky and Jan Komski.

References

External links
Gmina Bircza official website
Bircza Online! virtual shtetl, genealogy, and research website

Villages in Przemyśl County
Shtetls
Holocaust locations in Poland